Beautiful People is an American drama television series about a family that moves from New Mexico to New York City to make a fresh start on their lives. The series aired on the ABC Family network from August 8, 2005, to April 24, 2006, lasting sixteen episodes. Its executive producer was Paul Stupin, who played the same role for Dawson's Creek.

Plot 
An academically gifted teen Sophie Kerr (Sarah Foret), her model-beautiful older sister Karen Kerr (Torrey DeVitto) and their newly single mother Lynne Kerr (Daphne Zuniga) leave small town New Mexico in search of a new life in New York City. After their father runs off with his teenage mistress, Sophie and Karen decide their family needs a fresh start. They convince their mother that the big city holds promise for all of them. Sophie has received a scholarship to a Manhattan private school, Karen can pursue her dreams of modeling, and Lynn can leave the painful memories of her failed marriage behind her, while reviving the ambitions of becoming a fashion designer which she put on hold to raise a family.

Characters 
 Lynne Kerr (Daphne Zuniga): Lynne leaves New Mexico after her husband leaves her for her daughter Karen's best friend. When she arrives in New York City she is a retailer at first, until she gets a jump start in the fashion world and starts working for a prominent sportswear designer. She bumps into her college sweetheart Julian Fiske, for whom she still has feelings.
 Karen Kerr (Torrey DeVitto): Beautiful and vivacious, Karen is an aspiring model who is usually confident, but she loses some of that confidence when she begins taking diet pills to be thinner at the suggestion of one of her agents. Her first modeling gig is when she poses for the cover of a Brighton School magazine in a school business competition. She also worked wearing a chicken suit, among other odd gigs.
 Sophie Kerr (Sarah Foret): Gifted and intelligent, Sophie is a talented photographer who wins a scholarship to the prestigious Brighton School, a hub for the children of Manhattan's elite. She meets her good friend Gideon Lustig, who ends up falling for Sophie and Annabelle. Sophie finds herself in a romantic dilemma between elitist Nicholas Fiske and artistic Gideon.
 Gideon Lustig (Ricky Mabe): Sensitive and adorable Gideon is a vulnerable artist who is constantly put down by his wealthy, world-renowned artist father. Gideon believes that just because he has money doesn't mean he's better than others who aren't as fortunate. He develops a crush on Sophie Kerr and is caught in a love triangle with her and long-time best friend, Annabelle Banks.
 Annabelle Banks (Kathleen Munroe): An aspiring photographer, Annabelle is in the shadow of Gideon, her long-time crush, when Sophie Kerr rolls into town. Her parents are divorced and both her parents left six months after it was finalized, leaving Annabelle with a babysitter. Annabelle explores her sexuality, ultimately realizing that she is bisexual.
 Nicholas Fiske (Jackson Rathbone): Charming and extravagantly rich, Nicholas is the heir to Fiske Publications and is a BP and captain of the JV lacrosse team at the exclusive Brighton School. He turns his back on then-girlfriend Paisley Bishop to start a relationship with new girl Sophie Kerr, whose heart Nicholas competes for with Gideon.
 Paisley Bishop (Jordan Madley): Wealthy, snobbish, and popular, Paisley is a BP and is used to getting whatever she wants, unless longtime on-and-off boyfriend Nicholas Fiske is involved. Her family owns the Empire State Building and she drives a silver Porsche.
 Chris Pritchett (Sean Wing)

Episodes

Season 1 (2005)

Season 2 (2006)

Reception 
Common Sense Media gave the series 3 out of 5 stars, and wrote: "Drama best for teens and up lacks sizzle."

Michael Ausiello writing for TV Guide was disappointed by the season premiere, saying "it reduced Daphne Zuniga to a glorified extra". He felt it was trying to be a big-city Gilmore Girls and was ready to write off the show but his interest was piqued by the season finale which cast Zuniga's former Melrose Place costar Grant Show, as her character's ex-husband.

Home media release 

The series was released for region 1 on August 8, 2006.

References

External links 
 

2005 American television series debuts
2006 American television series endings
2000s American teen drama television series
ABC Family original programming
English-language television shows
Modeling-themed television series
Television series about teenagers
Television shows filmed in Toronto
Television series by Sony Pictures Television
Television shows set in New York City